RMBM may refer to:

Reichsministerium für Bewaffnung und Munition
Rocky Mountain Bible Mission